The 2017 Chinese Women's Football Championship was the 27th edition of the Chinese Women's Football Championship. Shanghai won their 7th title after beating Changchun Rural Commercial Bank 2–0 in the final.

Results

Group stage

Group A

Group B

Group C

Group D

Play-offs

9th–16th-place play-offs

First round

Second round
9th–12th place

13th–16th place

Third round
9th-place play-off

11th-place play-off

13th-place play-off

15th-place play-off

Championship Playoffs

First round

Second round
Semi-finals

5th–8th place

Third round
3rd-place play-off

5th-place play-off

7th-place play-off

Final

Final standings

References

2017 in Chinese football
February 2017 sports events in China
2017 in Chinese women's sport